Gordon Southern is a British comedian. He has performed headlining gigs in The UK, across Europe and all over the world, especially in Australia where he spends several months every year. He has performed several solo shows at the Edinburgh Festival Fringe, Adelaide Fringe and Melbourne Comedy Festival and New Zealand International Comedy Festival.

Shows include: The Longest Year/ Waiting for Gordo (2022 winner of a weekly comedy award at Adelaide Fringe, Nisolation (2021) That Boy Needs Therapy (2019-20) (nominated for best comedy at Perth Fringe WorldThat's a fun fact! (2017), Adelaide Hills Cop II (2016); Long Story Short (2015); Your New Favourite comedian (2014) (nominated for best comedy at Perth Fringe World and best international act at New Zealand Comedy Festival); The Kerfuffle (2013–14) (nominated for best show at Perth Fringe); A Brief History of History (2012/13) (nominated for best show at New Zealand Comedy Festival and Edinburgh Fringe Amused Moose Laughter awards); Free Range (2011); Borders (2010); The Unofficial Annual (2009); Stamp Stamp (2007); The Solutions (2006); My Drums Hell (2003); and Gordon Southern (2001).

He has also had several television and radio credits including The Cheese Shop, The 11 O'Clock Show, Stand Up Australia , Good News Week He appeared on Up Late on ABC and Stand and Deliver on ABC Australia (2016).

References

External links 
Gordon Southern's website
 
Glorious Management- Gordon Southern's agents
Gordon's Chortle Page

Living people
Year of birth missing (living people)
English male comedians